Cerapterus is a genus of beetles in the family Carabidae, containing the following species:

 Cerapterus benguelanus H.Kolbe, 1926 
 Cerapterus brancae Luna De Carvalho, 1961 
 Cerapterus burgeoni Reichensperger, 1937 
 Cerapterus calaharicus H.Kolbe, 1926 
 Cerapterus concolor Westwood, 1850 
 Cerapterus denoiti Wasmann, 1899 
 Cerapterus drescheri Reichensperger, 1935 
 Cerapterus elgonis Reichensperger, 1938 
 Cerapterus herrei Schultze, 1923 
 Cerapterus horni Reichensperger, 1925 
 Cerapterus horsfieldi Westwood, 1833 
 Cerapterus hottentottus H.Kolbe, 1896 
 Cerapterus immaculatus Luna De Carvalho, 1975 
 Cerapterus kolbei Lorenz, 1998 
 Cerapterus laceratus (C.A.Dohrn, 1891) 
 Cerapterus lafertei Westwood, 1850 
 Cerapterus latipes Swederus, 1788
 Cerapterus leoninus H.Kolbe, 1926 
 Cerapterus longihamus Reichensperger, 1933 
 Cerapterus myrmidonum H.Kolbe, 1896 
 Cerapterus oblitus Reichensperger, 1938 
 Cerapterus parallelus Wasmann, 1922 
 Cerapterus pilipennis Wasmann, 1922 
 Cerapterus pseudoblitus Luna De Carvalho, 1961 
 Cerapterus pygmaeus Luna De Carvalho, 1960 
 Cerapterus quadrimaculatus Westwood, 1841
 Cerapterus smithii Westwood, 1838 
 Cerapterus splendidus Wasmann, 1918 
 Cerapterus stalii Westwood, 1874 
 Cerapterus stuhlmanni H.Kolbe, 1895 
 Cerapterus trinitatis H.Kolbe, 1896

References

Paussinae